A. L. Raghavan (1933 – 19 June 2020) was an Indian playback singer, who sang many songs in Tamil-language films.

Biography 
Raghavan was born to a Saurashtra Brahmin family in Ayyampettai near Thanjavur to Lakshmana Bhagavathar, Raghavan entered the film world as a child artiste in the film Krishna Vijayam. He was married to the veteran actress M. N. Rajam. 

He died on 19 June 2020 due to COVID-19.

Career 
A. L. Raghavan started his career in 1947 with 'Krishna Vijayam' (1950) and 'Sudarsanam' as Lord Krishna. He also acted on TV series, 'Aliaigal'. As a boy, he was introduced by Chidambaram Jayaraman and sang in a girl's voice for Kumari Kamala in the film Vijayakumari.

Music composers he sang for 
Many music directors gave him memorable songs, including C. R. Subburaman, K. V. Mahadevan, Viswanathan–Ramamoorthy, S. M. Subbaiah Naidu, C. N. Pandurangan, S. V. Venkatraman, Ghantasala, H. R. Padmanabha Sastri, S. Dakshinamurthi, R. Sudarsanam, T. R. Pappa, Vedha, Master Venu, P. Adinarayana Rao, G. K. Venkatesh, V. Kumar, Rajan–Nagendra, Vijaya Bhaskar, G. Devarajan, M. S. Baburaj, Veenai S. Balachander, B. Gopalam, T. A. Kalyanam, K. G. Moorthy, S. P. Kodandapani, T. V. Raju and M. S. Viswanathan.

Playback singers he sang with 
He had many solo songs but also sang with other singers. He sang immemorable duets mostly with K. Jamuna Rani and L. R. Eswari. Others are P. Susheela, Jikki, S. Janaki, M. S. Rajeswari, A. P. Komala, A. G. Rathnamala, Soolamangalam Rajalakshmi, P. Leela, K. Swarna, Kausalya, Renuka, Sarala, M. R. Vijaya, Manorama, L. R. Anjali and Swarnalatha.

He also sang duets with male singers, most notably with T. M. Soundararajan, S. C. Krishnan, S. V. Ponnusamy, P. B. Sreenivas, J. P. Chandrababu, Seerkazhi Govindarajan, Thiruchi Loganathan, T. A. Mothi, Sai Baba, Malaysia Vasudevan, M. S. Viswanathan, K. Veeramani, G. K. Venkatesh, Dharapuram Sundararajan, S. P. Balasubrahmanyam and Sean Roldan.

Television 
 2001–2003 Alaigal  as Chandrasekhar (Sun TV) 
 2004–2006 Ahalya (Sun TV)

Filmography

References 

2020 deaths
Indian male playback singers
Tamil playback singers
20th-century Indian singers
Malayalam playback singers
1933 births
20th-century Indian male singers
Date of birth missing
Deaths from the COVID-19 pandemic in India